The 2018 KML Playoffs was the postseason tournament of the Korvpalli Meistriliiga's 2017–18 season. The playoffs began on 17 April and ended on 24 May. The tournament concluded with Kalev/Cramo defeating University of Tartu 4 games to 0 in the finals. Kristjan Kangur was named KML Finals MVP.

Bracket

Quarterfinals
The quarterfinals are best-of-five series.

AVIS UTILITAS Rapla v Tallinna Kalev/TLÜ

Valga-Valka/Maks & Moorits v Port of Pärnu

Semifinals
The quarterfinals are best-of-five series.

Kalev/Cramo v Port of Pärnu

University of Tartu v AVIS UTILITAS Rapla

Third place games
The third place games are best-of-five series.

AVIS UTILITAS Rapla v Port of Pärnu

Finals
The finals are best-of-seven series.

Kalev/Cramo v University of Tartu

References

External links
Official website

Korvpalli Meistriliiga playoffs
2018 KML Playoffs